This article details various records of German football club Eintracht Frankfurt under the categories listed below.

Player records

Appearances

Record appearances: Charly Körbel, 728, 1972–1991
Record league appearances: Charly Körbel, 602, 1972–1991
Record DFB-Pokal appearances: Charly Körbel, 70
Record European football appearances: Charly Körbel, 53
Most capped player: Makoto Hasebe, 114,  Japan
Most capped German player: Andreas Möller, 85
Most caps gained while at Eintracht: Jürgen Grabowski, 44
First capped player: Fritz Becker (at Eintracht predecessor FC Frankfurter Kickers) (for  Germany v  Switzerland, 3–5, 5 April 1908)

All-time appearances

Goalscorers
All-time record goalscorer: Karl Ehmer, 225 goals, 1927–1938
Most Bundesliga goals: Bernd Hölzenbein, 160 goals, 1967–1981
Most Bundesliga goals in one season: André Silva, 28 goals, 2020–21
Most DFB-Pokal goals: Bernd Hölzenbein, 23 goals
Most European goals: Bernd Hölzenbein, 24 goals

All-time goalscorers

Club records

Scores
Record Bundesliga win: 9–1 vs. Rot-Weiss Essen, Waldstadion (H), 5 October 1974
Record DFB-Pokal win: 
8–0 vs. Karlsruher SC, Wildparkstadion (A), 12 April 1959
8–0 vs. Rödelheimer FC 02, venue unknown (A), 19 December 1959
10–2 vs. Hertha Zehlendorf, Waldstadion (H), 15 October 1976
Record European win: 9–0 vs.  Widzew Łódź, Waldstadion (H), 30 September 1992
Record Bundesliga defeat: 0–7, vs. Karlsruher SC, Waldstadion (H), 19 October 1964

Firsts
First match: (as FFC Victoria) vs. 1. Bockenheimer FC 1899, Friendly, 4–1, venue unknown (H), 19 March 1899
First match: (as Eintracht Frankfurt) vs. SV Wiesbaden, Friendly, 2–2, venue unknown (H), 2 May 1920
First DFB-Pokal match: vs. SC Opel Rüsselsheim, 1–3, venue unknown (H), 11 May 1935
First Bundesliga match: vs. 1. FC Kaiserslautern, 0-0, Waldstadion (H), 24 August 1963
First match at Waldstadion: vs.  Boca Juniors, Friendly, lost 0–2, 27 May 1925
First European match: vs.  Young Boys, won 4–1, European Cup, Wankdorfstadion (A), 4 November 1959

Attendances

Record home attendance: 81,000 vs. FK Pirmasens, won 3–2, Waldstadion (H), 23 May 1959
Record European attendance: 127,621 vs.  Real Madrid, lost 3–7, Hampden Park, (N), 18 May 1960
Record season average attendance: 49,794, 2018–19

Transfers

Bought

Sold

Bundesliga records

Club records

Wins and losses
 Lowest number of losses in a season closing half: 0 by Eintracht Frankfurt (1976–77) same as Bayern Munich (1986–87, 2012–13 and 2019–20) and Borussia Dortmund (2011–12)
 Lowest number of losses in a season at home (34 games): 0 by Eintracht Frankfurt (1971–72 and 1973–74) same as 1860 Munich (1965–66), Bayern Munich (1970–71 to 1973–74, 1980–81, 1983–84, 1996–97, 1998–99, 2001–02, 2007–08 and 2016–17), MSV Duisburg (1970–71), Schalke 04 (1970–71), 1. FC Köln (1972–73 and 1987–88), Hertha BSC (1974–75 and 1977–78), Eintracht Braunschweig (1975–76), Hamburger SV (1981–82, 1982–83 and 1995–96), 1. FC Kaiserslautern (1981–82 and 1994–95), Werder Bremen (1982–83, 1984–85, 1985–86 and 1992–93), Borussia Mönchengladbach (1983–84), Karlsruher SC (1992–93), Bayer Leverkusen (1999–2000), VfL Wolfsburg (2008–09 and 2014–15), Borussia Dortmund (2008–09, 2015–16 and 2016–17)  and Hannover 96 (2011–12)
 Highest number of losses: 678 by Eintracht Frankfurt
 Lowest number of wins in a season away: 0 by Eintracht Frankfurt (1986–87 and 1995–96) same as Tasmania Berlin (1965–66), Karlsruher SC (1965–66, 1967–68 and 1976–77), Borussia Neunkirchen (1967–68), Borussia Dortmund (1967–68 and 1978–79), Hannover 96 (1969–70, 1971–72 and 2018–19), Alemannia Aachen (1969–70), Arminia Bielefeld (1971–72), Rot-Weiß Oberhausen (1972–73), Hertha BSC (1972–73 and 1982–83) Wuppertaler SV (1974–75), VfB Stuttgart (1974–75 and 2000–01), VfL Bochum (1975–76), Tennis Borussia Berlin (1976–77), Rot-Weiß Essen (1976–77), Bayern Munich (1977–78), Eintracht Braunschweig (1979–80), Bayer 05 Uerdingen (1980–81), Fortuna Düsseldorf (1981–82), MSV Duisburg (1981–82), 1. FC Nürnberg (1983–84), Kickers Offenbach (1983–84), FC 08 Homburg (1986–87), SV Waldhof Mannheim (1986–87), FC St. Pauli (1988–89 and 2001–02), Dynamo Dresden (1992–93), SG Wattenscheid 09 (1993–94), Borussia Mönchengladbach (1998–99 and 2004–05), 1. FC Köln (2003–04), SC Freiburg (2003–04), Schalke 04 (2020–21) and Greuther Fürth (2021–22)

Goals
 Lowest number of goals scored in a season opening half: 8 by Eintracht Frankfurt (1988–89) same as Tasmania Berlin (1965–66)

Runs
 Highest number of consecutive games unbeaten from start of the season closing half: 17 by Eintracht Frankfurt (1976–77) same as Bayern Munich (1986–87, 2012–13 and 2019–20)) and Borussia Dortmund (2011–12)

Player and manager records

Appearances
 Highest number of appearances as a player for one club: 602 by Charly Körbel for Eintracht Frankfurt (1972–73 to 1990–91)
 Highest number of appearances as a player for one club having not played for another club: 602 by Charly Körbel for Eintracht Frankfurt (1972–73 to 1990–91)
 Oldest age for a player making his debut appearance: 38 years and 171 days by Richard Kress for Eintracht Frankfurt (matchday 1 of 1963–64)
 Highest number of seasons as a player for one club: 19 by Charly Körbel for Eintracht Frankfurt (1972–73 to 1990–91) same as Klaus Fichtel (1965–66 to 1979–80 and 1984–85 to 1987–88) for Schalke 04, Manfred Kaltz for Hamburger SV (1971–72 to 1988–89 and 1990–91)
 Highest number of seasons as a player for one club having not played for another club: 19 by Charly Körbel for Eintracht Frankfurt (1972–73 to 1990–91)

Runs
 Highest number of consecutive seasons as a player for one club: 19 by Charly Körbel for Eintracht Frankfurt (1972–73 to 1990–91)
 Highest number of consecutive seasons as a player for one club, having not played for another club: 19 by Charly Körbel for Eintracht Frankfurt (1972–73 to 1990–91)

Cards
 Shortest elapsed timespan before receiving a red card: 43 seconds (after being substituted onto the pitch) by Marcel Titsch-Rivero of Eintracht Frankfurt (matchday 34 of 2010–11)

Honours and achievements

National

 German Championship
 Champions: 1958–59
 Runners-up: 1931–32
 DFB-Pokal
 Winners: 1973–74, 1974–75, 1980–81, 1987–88, 2017–18
 Runners-up: 1963–64, 2005–06, 2016–17
 2. Bundesliga
 Winners: 1997–98
 Runners-up: 2011–12
 DFB/DFL-Supercup
 Runners-up: 1988, 2018

International
 European Cup/UEFA Champions League
 Runners-up: 1959–60
 UEFA Cup/UEFA Europa League
 Winners: 1979–80, 2021–22
 UEFA Intertoto Cup
 Winners: 1966–67
 UEFA Super Cup
 Runners-up: 2022

Regional 
 Southern German Championship 
 Champions: 1929–30, 1931–32
 Runners-up: 1912–13+, 1913–14+, 1927–28, 1930–31
 Oberliga Süd
 Champions: 1952–53, 1958–59
 Runners-up: 1953–54, 1960–61, 1961–62
 Nordkreis-Liga
 Champions: 1911–12+, 1912–13+, 1913–14+
 Kreisliga Nordmain
 Winners: 1919–20+, 1920–21
 Runners-up: 1921–22
 Bezirksliga Main-Hessen:
 Winners: 1927–28, 1928–29, 1929–30, 1930–31, 1931–32
 Runners-up: 1932–33
 Gauliga Südwest/Mainhessen:
 Winners: 1937–38
 Runners-up: 1936–37
 Hesse Cup (Tiers 3-7):
 Winners: 1946, 1969*
 Runners-up: 1949
 Hesse Championship (Tier 3 & 4):
 Champions: 1970*, 2002*
 Runners-up: 1978*, 1983*, 1995*
 + As Frankfurter FV
 * Achieved by Reserve Team

Other

Friendly
 Cup of the Alps
 Winners: 1967
 Trofeo Conde de Fenosa:
 Winners: 1972
 Fuji-Cup:
 Winners: 1992
 Runners-up: 1994
 Antalya Cup:
 Winners: 2011
 Frankfurt Main Finance Cup:
 Winners: 2014, 2015, 2016, 2017
 Trofeo Bortolotti:
 Winners: 2016, 2022

Honours and awards
German Sportsteam of the Year
Winner: 2022

Youth
 German Under 19 championship
 Champions: 1982, 1983, 1985
 Runners-up: 1987
 Southern German Under 19 championship
 Champions: 1970
 Under 19 Hessenliga
 Champions: 1964, 1965, 1968, 1970, 1976, 1978, 1981, 1982, 1983, 1985, 1986, 1987, 1988, 1990, 1992, 1993, 1994, 1996
 Under 19 Gauliga Hessen-Nassau
 Champions: 1943
 German Under 17 championship
 Champions: 1977, 1980, 1991, 2010
 Runners-up: 1981, 1982
 Southern German Under 17 championship
 Champions: 1977
 Under 17 Hessenliga
 Champions: 1977, 1980, 1981, 1982, 1984, 1986, 1987, 1988, 1989, 1991, 1993, 1995, 1996, 1997, 1998, 1999, 2000, 2001, 2004
 Southern German Under 15 championship
 Champions: 1980, 1989, 1995, 2005, 2009, 2014
 Runners-up: 2011, 2013, 2015, 2018
 Under 15 Hessenliga
 Champions: 1976, 1977, 1978, 1979, 1980, 1983, 1985, 1986, 1989, 1990, 1993, 1995, 1997, 1998, 1999, 2001, 2002, 2003, 2004, 2005, 2007, 2008, 2009, 2010

Notes

References

External links
eintracht-archiv.de
eintracht-stats.de

Records
Frankfurt, Eintracht